Wang Ruiji (born 9 February 1957) is a Chinese fencer who competed at the 1984 and 1988 Summer Olympics. He is the father of Jackson Wang.

References

1957 births
Living people
Chinese male fencers
Olympic fencers of China
Fencers at the 1984 Summer Olympics
Fencers at the 1988 Summer Olympics
Asian Games medalists in fencing
Fencers at the 1978 Asian Games
Asian Games gold medalists for China
Asian Games silver medalists for China
Medalists at the 1978 Asian Games